SS Scoresby was a British cargo steamship that was built in 1923, sailed in a number of transatlantic convoys in 1940, and was sunk by a U-boat that October.

Building
Robert Thompson & Sons Ltd of Bridge Dockyard, Sunderland built Scoresby. She was launched on 18 December 1922 and completed in January 1923.

The boilers fed a three-cylinder triple expansion steam engine that was rated at 436 NHP and drove a single screw. The engine was built by the North Eastern Marine Engineering Co, Ltd, also of Sunderland.

Scoresby owner was Rowland and Marwood's Steam Ship Co, Ltd, who registered her in Whitby. She was managed by another Rowland and Marwood's company, Headlam & Sons.

Second World War career
By January 1940 Beatus was sailing in convoys. That month she sailed from Liverpool with Convoy OB 77 as far as the coast of Canada, whence she continued to San Domingo. In March she returned to the UK with a convoy of sugar, sailing via Halifax, Nova Scotia where she joined Convoy HX 28 that reached Liverpool on 2 April.

In May 1940 Scoresby crossed the North Atlantic from Britain to Saint John, New Brunswick. She sailed with Convoy OA 150G from Southend, which merged with Convoy OA 150G off Land's End to form Convoy OG 30 to Gibraltar. In June she returned to the UK with a cargo of pit props, sailing via Halifax, Nova Scotia where she joined Convoy HX 53 that reached Liverpool on 10 July.

Scoresby spent the rest of July and August in home waters, sailing in short-haul convoys around Britain. Then on 31 August she sailed from Methil in Scotland with Convoy OA 207 to Canada.

Convoy SC 7 and sinking
She sailed via St. Francis Harbour, Nova Scotia and Sydney, Nova Scotia, where she joined Convoy SC 7. Her Master was Lawrence Zebedee Weatherill, and she carried the Convoy Vice-Commodore. SC 7 left Sydney on 5 October. At first the convoy had only one escort ship, the  sloop . A wolf pack of U-boats found the convoy on 16 October and quickly overwhelmed it, sinking many ships over the next few days.

Two ships were hit and sunk: Scoresby and the French tanker .

References

1923 ships
Maritime incidents in October 1940
Ships sunk with no fatalities
Ships sunk by German submarines in World War II
Steamships of the United Kingdom
Ships built on the River Wear
World War II merchant ships of the United Kingdom
World War II shipwrecks in the Atlantic Ocean